This is a list of soccer clubs in the United States. For clarity, teams based outside the United States that play in USSF-recognized leagues are also listed below, with their home country noted.

Men's soccer clubs 
Five professional leagues of soccer teams are sanctioned by the Professional Division of the United States Soccer Federation (USSF or U.S. Soccer). The top-level league is Major League Soccer (MLS) and the second level is the USL Championship. The third level leagues are USL League One, the National Independent Soccer Association and MLS Next Pro. The USL Championship and USL League One are operated by the United Soccer League, which also operates the semi-professional USL League Two.

Major League Soccer (MLS) 

As of 2023, MLS has 29 clubs. Charlotte FC joined the league in 2022 and St. Louis City SC joined in 2023. Sacramento Republic FC had intended to join MLS in 2023, but its MLS bid was placed on indefinite hold after the team's lead investor Ron Burkle pulled out of the deal.

 * – Team based in Canada

USL Championship 
The United Soccer League is the parent organization for the USL Championship (USSF Division II), USL League One (applied for USSF Division III sanctioning), USL League Two, and the youth Super Y-League. In women's soccer, it also operates the USL W League and will operate the future USL Super League (applied for USSF women's Division II sanctioning).

Future teams

On hiatus

USL League One

National Independent Soccer Association
Launched in 2019, NISA is a USSF third division league independent from USL.

MLS Next Pro

Future teams

Women's soccer clubs

National Women's Soccer League 

As of the most recent 2022 season, the National Women's Soccer League has 12 clubs. Former commissioner Jeff Plush announced that the league planned to expand to 14 teams by 2020. At the time, Plush suggested that the league was in varying stages of talks with a dozen different potential expansion groups, including some from MLS organizations. In April 2016, MLS commissioner Don Garber stated that half of MLS teams could be running National Women's Soccer League teams in the near future. In May 2017, FC Barcelona announced that it had approved a plan to launch an expansion team in the league as soon as 2018, but those plans have yet to materialize.

The league has expanded prior to each of its two most recent seasons. In 2021, Racing Louisville FC started play in Louisville, Kentucky, and two California teams started play in 2022—Angel City FC in Los Angeles and San Diego Wave FC in San Diego. The San Diego team had originally been announced for Sacramento, but was placed on indefinite hold due to the issues surrounding the city's attempted MLS bid. The NWSL and the backers of the Sacramento bid then shifted their focus to San Diego, and on June 8, 2021, the NWSL officially announced that the San Diego team would start play in 2022 with former United States women's national soccer team head coach Jill Ellis as president.

The next league expansion will take place in the 2024 season when Utah Royals FC, which had been shut down after the 2020 season due to controversies surrounding the then-owner of its MLS parent, Real Salt Lake, will return to the league. Real's new ownership exercised an option to return to the NWSL.

Current teams

Future teams

By city

See also 
 United States soccer league system
 List of NCAA Division I men's soccer programs
 List of NCAA Division II men's soccer programs
 List of NCAA Division I women's soccer programs

Notes

References 

 
United States
Clubs
Soccer
Women's soccer clubs in the United States